Atlaserials (Atlas) is an online full-text collection of major religion and theology journals used by libraries, librarians, religion scholars, theologians, and clergy. Created by the American Theological Library Association and updated monthly, the database indexes journal articles and bibliographic citations, featuring PDFs, with searchable texts of articles and reviews, related to a wide range of scholarly fields related to religion. The database is available on a subscription basis through a database aggregator.

The total database includes over 588,000 article citations from over 330 journals.

Coverage
The database indexes scholarly works on major world religions. Some records cover articles as far back as the 19th century. 

Scholarly fields with significant degrees of coverage include:
 Bible
 Archaeology
 Antiquities
 Human culture and society
 Church history
 Mission
 Ecumenism
 Pastoral ministry
 World religions
 Religious studies
 Theology
 Philosophy
 Ethics

References

External links
Atlas at Atla website

Bibliographic databases and indexes
Year of establishment missing
Religion databases